Ivan Grabovac (born 12 July 1983) is a retired Croatian football goalkeeper.

References

External links
 

1983 births
Living people
Footballers from Rijeka
Association football goalkeepers
Croatian footballers
HNK Orijent players
NK Istra 1961 players
NK Karlovac players
FC Akzhayik players
Turan-Tovuz IK players
NK Inter Zaprešić players
Croatian Football League players
Kazakhstan Premier League players
Azerbaijan Premier League players
First Football League (Croatia) players
Croatian expatriate footballers
Expatriate footballers in Kazakhstan
Croatian expatriate sportspeople in Kazakhstan
Expatriate footballers in Azerbaijan
Croatian expatriate sportspeople in Azerbaijan